A Simple Man - Kasrils And The Zuma Enigma (2017) is a book by Ronnie Kasrils, a South African politician and former Minister of Intelligence Services in the cabinet of Thabo Mbeki.  The book is an account on South African President Jacob Zuma's raise to power and effect on the South African government.

Background and synopsis 
The book is highly critical of Zuma and alleges that Zuma is guilty of creating an increasingly corrupt and inept South African state.  The book is also critical of the content of Zuma's character accusing him of being "deceitful and manipulative." It argues that in addition to removing Zuma from office corrupt officials appointed by Zuma within state institutions also need to be removed before an effective and accountable South African government can be established.

References 

South African non-fiction books
Political books
2017 non-fiction books
Jacob Zuma
Deep politics
Books about the African National Congress